Oleh Krysa (born June 1, 1942) is a Ukrainian American violinist, Merited Artist of Ukraine.

Early life
Oleh Krysa was born in Uchanie, now Gmina Uchanie in the Lublin Voivodeship, Poland, into a family of Ukrainian aristocrats. In 1945, as a result of the so-called Operation Vistula, Oleh's family found itself in Lviv, where he grew up and spent his school years.

Although none of the family had any professional music background, his mother, who was often heard singing, wanted young Oleh to play violin, although his father preferred that he learned to play piano. Thus, at the age of six, Oleh started learning to play the violin. His first teacher was Konstantin Mikhailov [who, himself, was a pupil of Sergey Korguyev (known in the West as Serge P. Korgueff, a pupil and assistant of Leopold Auer]. After graduating from the Lviv Specialized Music School in 1960, Oleh Krysa entered the Moscow Conservatory. From 1960 to 1967 he studied there under David Oistrakh, who said of him: "Oleh has brilliant natural gifts, unusual musicality, vivid artistry, and great charm."

Career

Performing
After graduating from the Moscow Conservatory, Oleh Krysa performed as a soloist at the Kiev Philharmonic, at the same time teaching at the Kiev Conservatory. Six years later, he again headed for Moscow, where he joined the renowned Beethoven Quartet as the first violinist. He played with the ensemble until it dissolved in 1987. Since the 1960s, Oleh Krysa has continued to perform as a soloist with leading orchestras and chamber ensembles throughout the world.

As an advocate of modern music, Mr. Krysa has been privileged to premier works of such composers as Alfred Schnittke, Valentin Silvestrov, Myroslav Skoryk, Virko Baley, Vyacheslav Artyomov, Larry Sitsky, Sydney Hodkinson, Vera Ivanova and Nataliya Rozhko.

Teaching
 1969—1973 — first Chairman of Violin Department at Kiev Conservatory
 since 1971 — professor at Kiev Conservatory
 since 1973 — professor at Gnessin State Musical College, Moscow
 1974 — professor at Moscow Conservatory
 since 1989 — teacher, professor at Eastman School of Music, Rochester, New York, United States

Oleh Krysa regularly holds master classes at the following locations:
 Canada: Toronto, Montreal
 China: Shenyang
 Germany: Hanover, Freiburg, Hitzacker, Weimar
 Japan: Tokyo, Hamamatsu
 Korea: Seoul
 Poland: Warsaw, Łańcut
 U.S.A.: New York City, Boston, Oberlin, Philadelphia

Personal life

Family
 Wife: Tatiana Tchekina — pianist (1944-2013)
 Children: Peter — violinist; Taras — violinist and conductor; Andrej Madatov - violinist
 Siblings: Bogdan Krysa — violinist, pedagogue Kyiv Academy of Music; Roman Krysa — electronics engineer, graduate of Lviv Polytechnic

Recordings 
Oleh Krysa has recorded about 40 albums for the following labels: Melodya, BIS Records, Triton (Discordia), Lydian, PolyGram-Polska, Troppe Note/Cambria, Russian Disk (USA).

Partial discography
 Schnittke: Works for Violin and Cello (BIS, 2004)
 Schnittke: Violin Sonatas Nos.3 & 4. (BIS, 2004)
 Prelude in Memoriam Shostakovich (BIS, 2004)
 Ravel/Martinu/Honegger/Schulhoff (BIS, 1998)
 Bloch: Concerto For Violin And Orchestra/Poems Of The Sea/Suite Symphonique (BIS, 1995)
 The Leontovych String Quartet • Shostakovitch/Tchajkovsky (Greystone Records, ASIN: B000FEU70Y)
Ludwig van Beethoven: The Complete Violin Sonatas, Triton (DML Classics), 1999
 Collaboration with Mykola Suk

References
 Oleh Krysa. — in: Samuel Applebaum, Mark Zilberquit. «The Way They Play». Book 14. — Neptune, N.J.: Paganiniana Publications, 1986, p. 115—171.

External links
 Official web-site
 Eastman Music School web-site

Ukrainian violinists
Male violinists
Living people
1942 births
21st-century violinists
21st-century male musicians